A political transition team is used when there is a change of political leadership, to enable an orderly and peaceful transfer of power.

Canada 
When a new Prime Minister, provincial premier or party leader is elected; a transition team is usually assembled.

When the Progressive Conservative Association of Alberta and the Wildrose Party merged, and Jason Kenney was elected leader of the new United Conservative Party, a transition team was formed to assist with administrative functions and formal party processes.

United Kingdom 
When Boris Johnson was elected Conservative leader and appointed prime minister in 2019, a transition team was formed to oversee political issues like Brexit.

United States 

In America, a transition team assures a safe transition of power. In America transitions take about 11 weeks.

References

See also 

 Power (social and political)
 Military transition team

Political terminology
Political terms in the United Kingdom
Teams